Kalmar SS is a Swedish swim team from Kalmar founded in 1920. The team's home pool is Äventyrsbadet.

Swimmers
Sara Thydén

External links
Kalmar SS's official homepage 

Swimming clubs in Sweden
Sports clubs established in 1920
Sport in Kalmar County